Lovejoy are an indie rock band formed in Brighton, England. The band consists of William Gold as lead vocalist and rhythm guitarist, Joe Goldsmith as lead guitarist, Mark Boardman as drummer, and Ash Kabosu as bassist, with all four also sharing in songwriting. Their debut EP, Are You Alright?, was released on 8 May 2021. Their second EP, Pebble Brain, came out on 14 October 2021.

The band independently release their music under AWAL, as well as under their own label, Anvil Cat, legally registered as NVLCTRCRDS Ltd. Anvil Cat also owns the "Lovejoy" trademark. The band also run a limited liability partnership, Livejoy LLP, to manage their live performances.

History

Formation and Are You Alright? (2021)
Lovejoy was founded by William Gold and Joe Goldsmith in 2021. The two met from previously playing in the same folk group. Gold previous gained a following online for his Twitch streams and YouTube videos, as well as his solo music. The band was originally called "Hang the DJ", with the current name being named after Benedict Lovejoy, a friend of the band, who would sit with them during their early days of songwriting.

Gold was in a burger shop when he met bassist Ash Kabosu. Gold noticed the bass guitar on Kabosu's back and invited him to join the band. Gold met Mark Boardman, the drummer for the band, after hiring him on Fiverr on the first day of studio recording. After seeing Boardman perform, Gold invited him to join Lovejoy permanently instead, and he agreed.

The band's debut EP, Are You Alright?, was released on 8 May 2021. On 20 May 2021, Lovejoy debuted at number 10 on Billboards Emerging Artists chart.

Pebble Brain, singles, and radio appearances (2021–present)

Their second EP, Pebble Brain, was released on 14 October 2021, and peaked at number 12 on the UK Albums Chart. The songs of this EP had the theme of failed romantic relationships, but also expand to political unrest. In October 2022, the band issued their first two EPs, as well as their cover of "Knee Deep at ATP", to vinyl for the first time.

From November 2022, the band began to receive renewed attention on mainstream radio, with airtime on BBC Radio 1, and on Dutch radio show "". Their songs have also been featured on BBC Music Introducing. On 10 February 2023, Lovejoy released "Call Me What You Like", the lead single to their upcoming EP. The song peaked at number 32 on the Official UK Top 40 chart.

Members 
 William Gold – lead vocals, rhythm guitar, songwriting (2021–present)
 Joe Goldsmith – lead guitar, backing vocals, songwriting (2021–present)
 Ash Kabosu – bass, songwriting (2021–present)
 Mark Boardman – drums, songwriting (2021–present)

Discography

Extended plays

Singles

Other charted songs

Other appearances

Music videos

Notes

References

External links
 
 
 
 

2021 establishments in England
Musical groups established in 2021
English indie rock groups
Musical groups from Brighton and Hove
AWAL artists